José Santiago Hernández García (born 1 May 1997) is a Mexican professional footballer who plays as a goalkeeper for Liga MX club Atlas.

International career
Hernández was included in the under-21 roster that participated in the 2018 Toulon Tournament, where Mexico would finish runners-up.

Hernández was called up by Jaime Lozano to participate with the under-22 team at the 2019 Toulon Tournament, where Mexico won third place. He was called up by Lozano again to participate at the 2019 Pan American Games, with Mexico winning the third-place match.

Career statistics

Club

Honours
Atlas
Liga MX: Apertura 2021, Clausura 2022
Campeón de Campeones: 2022

Mexico U23
Pan American Bronze Medal: 2019

References

1997 births
Living people
Mexican footballers
Atlas F.C. footballers
Liga MX players
Liga Premier de México players
Tercera División de México players
Association football goalkeepers
Footballers from Guadalajara, Jalisco
Pan American Games medalists in football
Pan American Games bronze medalists for Mexico
Footballers at the 2019 Pan American Games
Medalists at the 2019 Pan American Games
Mexico under-20 international footballers